The 2017 Vuelta a España was a three-week Grand Tour cycling stage race that took place in Spain between 19 August and 10 September 2017. The race was the 72nd edition of the Vuelta a España and the final Grand Tour of the 2017 cycling season. The race started in Nîmes, France, and finished in Madrid. It was the first time the race has started in France and only the third time it has started outside Spain, after 1997 (Portugal) and 2009 (Netherlands).

Froome became the third rider to win the Tour-Vuelta double after Jacques Anquetil (1963) and Bernard Hinault (1978), and the first to do so since the Vuelta was moved to its current calendar position.	
Froome also won the points and combination classifications, becoming the first rider to win three jerseys in a single Vuelta since Denis Menchov in 2007. The mountains classification was won by  rider Davide Villella, while 's Alberto Contador won the combativity award in his final Grand Tour, as well as the final mountain stage atop the iconic Angliru. Astana took the team award.

Teams 

The 2017 edition of the Vuelta a España consisted of 22 teams. All eighteen UCI WorldTeams were entitled, and obliged, to enter the race. On 27 March 2017, the organiser of the Vuelta, Unipublic, announced the four second-tier UCI Professional Continental teams given wildcard invitations. The presentation of the teams – where the members of each team's roster are introduced in front of the media and local dignitaries – took place inside the Arena of Nîmes in Nîmes, France, on 19 August, before the start of stage one, held in the city.

Each squad was allowed a maximum of nine riders, resulting in a start list total of 198 riders. Of these, 75 were competing in their first Vuelta a España. The total number of riders that finished the race was 158. The riders came from 33 countries. Six countries had more than 10 riders in the race: Spain (31), France (20), Italy (20), Belgium (17), the Netherlands (15), and Colombia (12). The average age of riders in the race was 27.6 years, ranging from the 20-year-old Lennard Kämna to the 40-year-old Svein Tuft.  had the youngest average age while  had the oldest.

The teams entering the race were:

Pre-race favourites 

Reigning Vuelta champion Nairo Quintana chose not to defend his title, after having competed in both the Giro d'Italia and the Tour de France earlier in the season. Chris Froome, who arrived at the Vuelta having won his fourth Tour de France the month before, was considered the favourite by most commentators and bookmakers. Froome had previously finished second at the Vuelta on three occasions. A victory in Spain would make him only the third rider after Jacques Anquetil (in 1963) and Bernard Hinault (in 1978) to win both the Tour and the Vuelta in the same season, and the first rider to do so since the race was moved in the calendar from spring to late summer. It would also make him the first British rider to win the race.

In Quintana's absence, bib number one was handed to three-time winner Alberto Contador, who announced in early August that he would retire from cycling after the race. Contador was considered to be among the favourites, although his performances in recent Grand Tours had cast doubt upon his potential. 2010 winner Vincenzo Nibali was considered to be Froome's closest rival for overall victory, having skipped the Tour de France. Fabio Aru, winner of the 2015 edition, started the race as a favourite as well after he performed well to finish fifth overall at the Tour de France.

The previous year's third-placed finisher, Esteban Chaves, was also given chances to win the race overall. Other riders mentioned to potentially finish high in the general classification were Steven Kruijswijk and Rafał Majka, third in 2015. Potential favourites to make their debut at the Vuelta were Ilnur Zakarin, who had finished fifth at the Giro d'Italia in May, as well as both Adam and Simon Yates (both ).

Route and stages 

The route of the 2017 Vuelta a España was revealed by Unipublic on 12 January 2017. Keeping with the tradition of the past few years, the race started off with a team time trial. However, the race started in France, just the third time in history that the Spanish Grand Tour began outside of its home country.

The third stage saw the race leave France, with a mountain stage to Andorra la Vella. The first uphill finale was on stage 5, with a summit finish atop the Ermita de Santa Lucía. The queen stage of the 2017 Vuelta was stage 20, which featured a summit finish atop the Alto de l'Angliru. Finally, the race ended with a customary circuit race in Madrid.

Classification leadership 

The Vuelta a España had three individual classifications, for which jerseys were awarded daily to the leading rider, as well as a team competition. The primary classification was the general classification, which was calculated by adding each rider's finishing times on each stage. Time bonuses were awarded at the end of every stage apart from the two individual time trials. The rider with the lowest cumulative time was the leader of the general classification, and wears the red jersey. The leader of the general classification at the end of the race was considered the overall winner of the Vuelta a España.

The second classification was the points classification. Riders received points for finishing among the highest placed in a stage finish, or in intermediate sprints during the stage. The points available for each stage finish were determined by the stage's type. The leader was identified by a green jersey.

The next classification was the mountains classification. Points were awarded to the riders that reached the summit of the most difficult climbs first. The climbs were categorized, in order of increasing difficulty, third-, second-, and first- and special-category. The leader wore a white jersey with blue polka dots.

The final of the individual classifications was the combination classification. A rider's ranking in the combination classification was determined by tallying up his positions in the general, points, and mountains classifications. The leader wore a white jersey. If no rider was classified in all three classifications, riders classified in two would have been considered, and if that was tied the general classification will decide the winner.

There was also the team classification. After each stage, the times of the three highest finishers of each team are added together. The victory was awarded to the team with the lowest cumulative time at the end of the event.

In addition, there were two individual awards: the combativity award and the young rider award. The combativity award was given after each stage to the rider "who displayed the most generous
effort and best sporting spirit." The daily winner wore a green number bib the following stage. At the end of the Vuelta, a jury decides the top three riders for the "Most Combative Rider of
La Vuelta", with a public vote deciding the victor. The young rider award is calculated the same way as the general classification, but the classification was restricted to riders who were born on or after 1 January 1992. The leader wore a red number bib.

A total of €1,120,230 will be awarded in cash prizes in the race. The overall winner of the general classification will receive €150,000, with the second and third placed riders getting €57,000 and €30,000 respectively. All finishers in the top 20 were awarded with money. The holders of the four individual classifications benefited on each stage they led. The final winners of the points and combined were given €11,000, while the mountains classification got €23,100 and the most combative rider got €3,000. The team classification winners were given €12,500. €11,000 was given to the winners of each stage of the race, with smaller amounts given to places 2–20. There was also a special award with a prize of €1,000, the Cima Alberto Fernández, given to first rider (Miguel Ángel López) to reach the summit of the Alto Hoya de la Mora at the finish of stage fifteen.

Final standings

General classification

Points classification

Mountains classification

Combination classification

Team classification

UCI rankings 
The race was the 25th of the 38 events in the UCI World Tour, with riders from the WorldTeams competing for individually and for their teams for points that contributed towards the rankings. Riders from both the WorldTeams and Professional Continental teams also competed individually and for their nations for points that contributed towards the UCI World Ranking, which included all UCI races. The points accrued by Chris Froome moved him up to second from tenth in the World Tour and rose to third from sixth in the World Ranking. Greg Van Avermaet held the lead of both individual rankings.  took the lead of the World Tour team ranking and Belgium remained top of the World Ranking nation ranking.

Adverse analytical finding 
On 13 December 2017, it was announced by Team Sky that Chris Froome was found with 2000 ng/ml of Salbutamol in a sample collected on 7 September, after the finish of stage 18. Froome, who suffers from asthma, is allowed a dose of 1000 ng/ml. If the UCI had found this to be a doping violation, he could have lost his Vuelta title and faced a potential ban from competitive cycling.  On 2 July 2018, the UCI, with the cooperation of WADA, ruled that upon review of the submitted evidence that there was no wrongdoing and closed the case, exonerating Froome and allowing his 2017 Vuelta win to stand.

See also

 2017 in men's road cycling
 2017 in sports

Notes and references

Footnotes

References

Sources

External links 

 

 
2017 in Andorran sport
2017 in French sport
2017 in Spanish road cycling
2017 UCI World Tour
Cycle races in Andorra
Cycle races in France
August 2017 sports events in France
August 2017 events in Spain
August 2017 sports events in Europe
September 2017 events in Spain
September 2017 sports events in Europe
2017